Isabel Soveral (born 1961 in Oporto) is a Portuguese composer of contemporary music.

She graduated from the Conservatório Nacional de Lisboa   where she studied with the composers Jorge Peixinho and Joly Braga Santos.

In 1988, she attended the State University of New York at Stony Brook, where she studied with Daria Semegen and Bulent Arel, having completed her masters (1991) and PhD (1994) in Composition at that university.

She was a Fellow of Calouste Gulbenkian Foundation, Luso-American Foundation and Fulbright Program.

She is part of an important group of Portuguese composers who appeared in the 1980s.

Life and work 

Her music ha been performed in Portugal, Spain, France, Austria, Belgium, Bulgaria, Italy, Hungary, Switzerland, Poland, Sweden, Czech Republic, Hong Kong, Macao, South Korea, Argentina, Brazil, Cuba and the USA.

She has had several works released on CD by the publishers Portugalsom and Strauss, EMI Classics, Nova Música, Capella, Deux-Elles, Numérica, ISCM-WMD, Miso Records, Plancton, IPCB and Musicamera,
as well as scores published by Musicoteca, Fermata, Cecilia Honegger, IPCB and MIC.

She has been Professor of Composition, Theory and Musical Analysis in the Department of Communication and Art of the University of Aveiro since 1995.

She has been the director of the CIME (Center for Research in Electroacoustic Music of UA) since 2014, having created the EAW (Electroacoustic Winds) platform. The last edition of this international conference has the following link: http://eaw.web.ua.pt/

She has been a member of the Scientific Council of the Portuguese Music Research Center (CIMP) since 2008

Highlighted works of her catalogue 
   Contornos (1987), winner of the JMP Exposition Competition and "The 1998 ISCM-ACL World Music Days", Hong Kong;
  ... A soir j'ai assis la Beauté sur mes genoux - Et je l'ai trouvée amère (1998), for chamber group, commissioned by Culturgest
  Inscriptions sur une Peinture (1998), for chamber orchestra, commissioned by Teatro Nacional S. Carlos.
 Heart I, II - 2001, guitar solo
 Heart III - 2014, for guitar and bass flute, commissioned by Grupo Machina Lírica Duo
 Cycle Anamorphoses - 1993-2019:
Anamorphoses III (1995), for violin and electronics;

Anamorphoses VII (2002), for chamber orchestra, commissioned by Casa da Música;

Anamorphoses VIII (2014), commissioned by DGartes - DuoContracello;

Anamorphoses IX   (2018) for cello and orchestra, commissioned by Casa da Música;

Anamorphoses VIII (2019) for cello, double bass, electronics and image, commissioned by Duo Contracello

Cycle Mémoires d'Automne - 1999-2003: 
Image I, for solo marimba.
 Cycle Le Navigateur du Soleil Incandescent - 2005-2016: 
Première lettre (2005), viola and piano, commissioned by Festival of Póvoa do Varzim;

Deuxième lettre (2006), counter-tenor, choir and orchestra, commissioned by

Gulbenkian Foundation;

Paradeisoi (2007), orchestra, commissioned by F. C. Gulbenkian.

Quatrième lettre (2010), Chamber group, commissioned by Miso Music.
Première lettre(2016), flutes and piano;
 Shakespeare's Cycle - 2007-2014: 
Since Brass nor stone ... (2007), soprano and electronic;

Kingdom of the Shore (2012), voice, video and electronics. commissioned by Festivais de Outono
 Cycle Four Elements (2014–15): 
O Dragão Watatsumi (2015), six percussionists, order DGartes - Drumming group

Ferreira, António: Miso Music Portugal: A History of Electroacoustic Music in Portugal [www.cime-icem.net/Doc/Portugal.doc], accessed 8 February 2010
Mention of Soveral's Anamorphoses (1994), accessed 8 February 2010

External links
Ideias soltas site (Portuguese), accessed 8 February 2010
Soveral recording online, accessed 8 February 2010

1961 births
Living people
Portuguese women composers
Portuguese composers
Stony Brook University alumni
Women classical composers
Musicians from Porto
Fulbright alumni